Thenoyltrifluoroacetone, C8H5F3O2S, is a chemical compound used pharmacologically as a chelating agent. It is an inhibitor of cellular respiration by blocking the respiratory chain at complex II.

Perhaps the first report of TTFA as an inhibitor of respiration was by A. L. Tappel in 1960. Tappel had the (erroneous) idea that inhibitors like antimycin and alkyl hydroxyquinoline-N-oxide might work by chelating iron in the hydrophobic milieu of respiratory membrane proteins, so he tested a series of hydrophobic chelating agents. TTFA was a potent inhibitor, but not because of its chelating ability. TTFA binds at the quinone reduction site in Complex II, preventing ubiquinone from binding. The first x-ray structure of Complex II showing how TTFA binds, 1ZP0, was published in 2005
.

References 

Thiophenes
Diketones
Chelating agents
Trifluoromethyl compounds